Crochu is a town in Saint Andrew Parish, Grenada.  It is located towards the southern end of the island, along the eastern coast.

References

Populated places in Grenada